Frederick Philipse (born Frederick Flypsen; 1626 in Bolsward, Netherlands – December 23, 1702), first Lord of the Manor of Philipseborough (Philipsburg) and patriarch of the Philipse family, was a Dutch immigrant to North America of Bohemian heritage.  A merchant, he arrived in America as early as 1653. In 1662, he  married Margaret Hardenbrook de Vries, a wealthy and driven widow. Together, and variously in league with slavers, pirates, and other undesirables, the couple amassed a fortune.

Beginning in 1672 Philipse and some partners started acquiring land in what was to become lower Westchester County, New York. Serving later on the Governor's executive council, he was subsequently banned from government office for conducting a slave trade into New York.

Upon his death, Philipse was one of the greatest landholders in the Province of New York. He owned the vast stretch of land spanning from Spuyten Duyvil Creek, in the Bronx (then in lower Westchester County), to the Croton River. He was regarded by some as the richest man in the Colony. His son Adolphus acquired substantial land north of modern Westchester sanctioned as the royal Philipse Patent.  Stripped from the family after the Revolution for their Tory sympathies, the some  tract became the present-day Putnam County, New York.

Biography

Frederick Philipse emigrated from the Friesland area of the Netherlands to Flatbush, New Netherland, on Long Island, and began his career by selling iron nails then rose to become an owner of taverns.

The land that would become Philipsburg Manor was first bought from Adriaen van der Donck, who had invested in an unsuccessful Dutch patroonship in New Netherland before the English takeover in 1664. Frederick Philipse I, Thomas Delavall, and Thomas Lewis purchased the first tracts of land in 1672 in current-day northern Yonkers. Philipse made several additional purchases between 1680 and 1686 from the Wiechquaeskeck and Sintsink Indian tribes, expanding the property to both the north and south; he also bought a small plot of land from the Tappans west of the Hudson River.

Philipse also bought out his partners' stakes during this time, enticing friends from New Amsterdam and Long Island to move with him with the promise of free land and limited taxes.

The estate's boundaries were the Spuyten Duyvil Creek, the Croton River, the Hudson River, and the Bronx River. Philipse was granted a royal charter in 1693, creating the Manor of Philipsburg, and making him first lord of the manor. Along with the three other main manors of the colony—Rensselaerswyck, Cortlandt, and Livingston—Philipsburg created one of the richest and most powerful families in the colony.

After swearing allegiance to the English and later being granted his manorship from them, he built in 1693 the first bridge connecting New York City with the mainland, erecting King's Bridge over the Spuyten Duyvil at Marble Hill.  He also began construction of the Old Dutch Church of Sleepy Hollow. Although this project had financing, work likely progressed slowly and was completed in 1685. Philipse built a simple residence in today's Getty Square neighborhood of Yonkers, New York near the confluence of the Nepperhan River with the Hudson.  Later it was expanded by his descendants into a full-fledged mansion, Philipse Manor Hall. The neighborhood of Kingsbridge, Bronx, is named for his bridge over the Harlem River.

In 1685 Philipse imported about 50 slaves directly from Angola on his own ship. He was also an interloper, trading to the east of the Cape of Good Hope, and becoming a known trading partner of Madagascar pirate-merchants such as Adam Baldridge and Edward Welch, employing traders like Thomas Mostyn and John Thurber to make the New York-to-Madagascar voyages. In the 1690s, Baldridge supplied many of the slaves traded and owned by the Philipse family; in return Philipse sent Baldridge guns, alcohol, and other supplies much in demand by pirates.

Philipse was on the Governor's executive council from 1691 to 1698, when he was banned from government office by the British governor, Lord Bellomont, for conducting a slave trade into New York.

Philipse died in 1702 and is buried with his two wives in the crypt of the Old Dutch Church of Sleepy Hollow.

Family

The Philipse family is of Bohemian origin. According to Supreme Court Justice John Jay, (whose maternal grandmother, Eva de Vries, had been adopted by Frederick Philipse upon his marriage to Margaret Hardenbroeck de Vries): "Frederick Philipse, whose family, originally of Bohemia, had been compelled by popish persecution to take refuge in Holland, from whence he had emigrated to New York." By another account, Philipse was the son of Vicount Philipse  of Bohemia and Margaret Dacres, supposed to have been a lady of good family from the parish of Dacre, England

Philipse had eleven children with his first wife, Margaret: Philip Philipse, Adolphus Philipse, Annetje Philipse, Adolph Phillipse, Anna Philipse, Rombout Philipse, Frederick Phillipse, Charles Phillips, Hendrick Phillips, Catherine Phillips, and William Phillips.

Margaret died in 1691. A year later, Frederick married the widow Catharine Van Cortlandt Derval, who survived him for many years. She was the sister of Stephanus Van Cortlandt, an adviser to the provincial governor. Her brother Jacobus Van Cortlandt married Frederick's adopted daughter Eva and their son Frederick Van Cortlandt later built the Van Cortlandt House Museum in Van Cortlandt Park in the Bronx, New York.  Jacobus and Eva's daughter, Mary, was the mother of John Jay by her marriage to Peter Jay.

In 1697 Adolphus Philipse, Frederick's second son, purchased a tract from Dutch traders which received British Royal sanction as the Highland Patent.  Subsequently, known as the "Philipse Patent", the roughly 250 square miles parcel extended eastward from the Hudson River at the northern border of Westchester County some 20 or so miles to the Colony of Connecticut.

Philip Philipse, the eldest and heir to the Manor, hereditary title, and family commercial holdings, died in either 1699 or 1700. By predeceasing his father, the legacy that would have gone to Philip bypassed him and was distributed between Adolphus and Philip's son, Frederick Philipse II. By the terms of Frederick Philipse's last will and testament, dated 26 October 1700, proved 1702, Adolphus received all the Manor north of Dobb's Ferry, including the present town.  He was also named proprietor of a tract of land on the west bank of the Hudson north of Anthony's Nose and executor of Philip's estate.

After the bachelor Adolphus' death in 1749 (Smith, others 1750), his Manor holdings and the Highland Patent passed to his nephew, Frederick Philipse II, his only heir-at-law, who became the second Lord of the Manor at Philipsborough.

On Frederick II's death in 1751 all Manor holdings and the title went to his eldest son Frederick Philipse III, the third Lord of the Manner of Philipsburg.  The Highland Patent – today's Philipse Patent – was divided among Frederick II's surviving offspring, son Philip Philipse, and daughters, Susannah (wife of Beverley Robinson), Mary (wife of Col. Roger Morris), and Margaret (who died intestate, her share being divided among the other three).

Frederick III leased the entirety of his property to William Pugsley before siding with the British in the American Revolution and leaving New York City for England in 1783. After the Revolution, the entire Philipse holdings, including the Manor and other lands in today's Westchester County, and the Highland Patent, were seized by New York and sold by its Commissioners of Forfeitures. In all, the lands were divided up into almost 200 different parcels, with the vast majority of the Philipse Patent becoming today's Putnam County, and other large parcels going to Dutch New York businessman Henry Beekman.

Descendants

John Jay (1745–1829), delegate and president of Continental Congress, drafter of the US Constitution, US Ambassador to France and Spain, first Chief Justice of the US
Henry Brockholst Livingston (1757–1823), Justice of US Supreme Court
Alexander Slidell MacKenzie (1842–67), an officer in the United States Navy during the American Civil War and his brother General Ranald S. Mackenzie.
Jay Pierrepont Moffat (1896–1943), notable American diplomat, historian and statesman who, between 1917 and 1943, served the State Department in a variety of posts, including that of Ambassador to Canada during the first year of United States participation in World War II.
John Watts de Peyster (1821–1907),  Brigadier General in the New York State Militia during the American Civil War and philanthropist and military historian after the war.
Eva Philipse, adopted daughter of Frederick Philipse I, born Eva de Vries 1660, married Jacobus van Cortland
Margaret Philipse, youngest daughter of Frederick II,  bap. Feb. 4, 1733; heiress to Philipse Patent, died intestate some time after 1751 bequeathal and before 1754 division; share redistributed to siblings Philip, Mary, and Susanna.
Mary Philipse (1730–1825), eldest daughter of Frederick Philipse II, and possible early romantic interest of George Washington, loyalist, wife of British Colonel Roger Morris, owner of the Mount Morris in Manhattan. Heiress to Philipse Patent.
Philip Philipse, son of Frederick Philipse II, heir to Philipse Patent.
Susanna Philipse, middle daughter of Frederick Philipse II, married to Beverley Robinson, mother of Frederick Philipse Robinson, heiress to Philipse Patent.  Possible romantic interest of George Washington.
Sir Frederick Philipse Robinson (1763–1852), son of a Virginian soldier who fought for England during the American War of Independence, also was an Empire Loyalist.
Jonathan Mayhew Wainwright III (1864–1945), US Congressman and Army officer in the Spanish–American War.

See also
Philipsburg Manor
Van Cortlandt family

References
Notes

Bibliography

External links
 Putnam's past

1626 births
1702 deaths
American members of the Dutch Reformed Church
American people of Bohemian descent
American people of Dutch descent
American slave owners
American slave traders
Interlopers (business)
People from Bolsward
People of the Province of New York
People of New Netherland
Frederick 1626